

This is a list of aircraft produced or proposed by Airspeed Limited a British aircraft manufacturer from 1931 to 1951.

List of aircraft and projects

References

Notes

Bibliography

Airspeed